Andranik Madadian (born April 22, 1958), better known by his stage name, Andy is an Iranian-Armenian singer-songwriter and actor. He immigrated to United States and currently lives in Los Angeles. He sings in several languages including Persian, Armenian and English.

Career

Duo in Andy and Kouros

Andy first gained recognition when he joined Kouros Shahmiri and they formed the successful duo Andy & Kouros, going on to release 4 albums together: Khastegary (1985), Parvaz (1987), the hugely successful album Balla (1990), and Goodbye (1991). The two split in 1992, with both Andy and Kouros going on to have successful individual solo careers. The two reunited several times after that point. In 2002 and 2004, they performed together for a sold-out audience in San Jose, California. In 2009, Andy & Kouros they went on an international tour together in the Iranian diaspora, and performed together again in May 2010. They also appeared together on a music video by Farez remaking their hit "Niloufar".

Solo career
Andy has released 16 albums as a solo artist. His last three singles have ranked No. 1 in the charts. In 2013, Andy was nominated for Best Male Artist, Best Live Act, and Best Entertainer of the Year at the World Music Awards. The following year, he was presented with the "Millennium" award at the Big Apple Music Awards in New York City. On January 17, 2020, Andy was honored by the Hollywood Walk of Fame With his star being the 2,684th star.

Other collaborations
On June 24, 2009, Andy, Harout Bedrosian and Jon Bon Jovi recorded a version of the Leiber and Stoller standard Stand by Me, described by producer Don Was as a "worldwide solidarity with the people of Iran". The Persian introduction is done by both Andy and Jon Bon Jovi, as well as the rest of the song which continues in English. The record was produced by Don Was and John Shanks and was registered at Henson Studio C, Hollywood, Los Angeles, California. He participated in a prestigious recording session for World Peace One, which featured some of the world's most successful artists uniting to promote peace. In 2014, Cherokee Music Productions released the humanitarian single, We Hear Your Voice which brought together 15 international stars from 11 countries to inspire fans and followers to find common ground and heal the divide between nations.

In March 2016, Andy released a duet with La Toya Jackson called "Tehran".

In April 2019, Andy released a duet with Algerian singer Khaled called "Salama So Good".

In January 2020, Andy released an English song titled "The Good Fight", which was featured in the motion picture "American Fighter“.

Personal life 
Andy married his longtime girlfriend and artist Shani Rigsbee on November 11, 2011. Around 1992, the couple began working and touring together. Soon after they discovered Shani had ovarian cancer, and she had an early hysterectomy in 1992. The couple is associated with cancer-related charities and has performed together for the American Cancer Society's Relay for Life.

Awards and honors
On January 17, 2020, Madadian was awarded the 2684th star on the Hollywood Walk of Fame, becoming the first Iranian to receive the honor. His star is located at Highland Avenue at 6810 Hollywood Boulevard in Los Angeles.

Discography

Albums

Andy & Kouros

Andy

Non-Album Singles & Collaborations

Videos/DVDs
 The Journey
 Orere Seero
 Platinum
 City of Angels
 Balla!
 Andy Live at the Kodak Theatre

Filmography

Gallery

See also
Andy & Kouros
Kouros Shahmiri
Leila Kasra

References

Sources
Tehran Magazine.  Choose the Best: Andy, Mansour, or Shahram Kashani   Issue 476.  Page 72-76

External links
 
 Andy Madadian Official on Facebook
 Andy Madadian on Twitter
 Andymusic1 on Instagram
 Andy Madadian on Spotify
 ANDY Lovers Forum

1958 births
Living people
20th-century Iranian male singers
Iranian pop singers
Iranian singer-songwriters
American male pop singers
American male singer-songwriters
Ethnic Armenian singers
Ethnic Armenian male actors
Singers from Tehran
Exiles of the Iranian Revolution in the United States
Iranian people of Armenian descent
Caltex Records artists
Taraneh Records artists
Naturalized citizens of the United States
American singer-songwriters